Ramthep Chaipan (born 4 January 1977) is a Thai retired professional footballer who played as a defensive midfielder.

Personal life

Ramthep's brother Annop Chaipan is also a footballer and plays as a defensive midfielder.

Club career

He previously played for Bangkok University FC in the 2007 AFC Champions League group stage.

References

1977 births
Living people
Ramthep Chaipan
Ramthep Chaipan
Association football midfielders
Ramthep Chaipan
Ramthep Chaipan
Ramthep Chaipan
Ramthep Chaipan
Ramthep Chaipan
Ramthep Chaipan